Eugen Lakatos (24 October 1912 – 18 February 1949) was a Romanian footballer who played as a midfielder.

International career
Eugen Lakatos made six appearances at international level for Romania, making his debut in a friendly against Poland which ended with a 5–0 loss. Lakatos played three games at the 1933 Balkan Cup and one game at the 1931–1934 Central European Cup for Amateurs, both tournaments being won by Romania. He also played one game against Switzerland, which ended 2–2 at the 1934 World Cup qualifiers.

Honours
Chinezul Timișoara
Divizia A: 1925–26, 1926–27
UD Reșița
Divizia A: 1930–31
Ripensia Timișoara
Divizia A: 1932–33, 1934–35, 1935–36
Cupa României: 1933–34, 1935–36, runner-up 1934–35, 1936–37
Tricolor Ploiești
Divizia B: 1937–38
Romania
Balkan Cup: 1933
Central European International Cup: 1931–34

Notes

References

External links
Eugen Lakatos at Labtof.ro

1912 births
1949 deaths
Romanian footballers
Romania international footballers
Association football midfielders
Liga I players
Liga II players
CSM Reșița players
FC Ripensia Timișoara players